Assignment: Underwater is an American adventure television series which aired in NTA Film Network syndication from 1960 to 1961.

Overview
The series stars prolific B-movie actor Bill Williams and Diane Mountford. Williams played Bill Greer, the skipper aboard a charter boat named The Lively Lady. Mountford played his daughter, Patty.

The series was written and produced by Frank De Felitta for Liberty Enterprises and National Telefilm Associates.

Episode list

See also

References

External links

1960 American television series debuts
1961 American television series endings
American adventure television series
1960s American drama television series
Black-and-white American television shows
English-language television shows
First-run syndicated television programs in the United States
Television series by CBS Studios